St. John's Lutheran Church is located in rural Franklin County, Iowa, United States, west of the city of Hampton.  The church property was listed as a historic district on the National Register of Historic Places as St. John's Danish Evangelical Lutheran Church in 2015.  At the time of its nomination it contained ten resources, which included five contributing buildings, two contributing sites, one contributing structure, one contributing object, and one non-contributing structure.

Founded in June 1879, St. John's was one of the few all-Danish congregations in Iowa.   They bought  of land in July 1883, and completed a parsonage the same year.  The front portion of the present frame church was dedicated on March 25, 1889, and it was enlarged ten years later to its present T-plan.  A hall to house the Danish language school was completed in 1896, and it was replaced by the present structure in 1917.  The present parsonage was built in 1950.  The other contributing buildings include the parsonage garage, and the garage for the custodian's house (the house is no longer extant). The  ornamental entrance gate and metal fence are the structure. The object is a stepping stone utilized by those who arrived by carriage.  The sites include the remaining  of land and the cemetery.  The congregation had to sell off most of its land to pay off debts during difficult financial times.  The cemetery, which surrounds the church, is significant because it is believed it initially followed a European burial tradition.  Plots were not sold until the early 1940s with perpetual care plots, but early photographs of the property show the existence of graves whose markers are no longer extant.  Early burials used light coffins and successive burials were superimposed over the older.

References

Religious organizations established in 1879
Churches completed in 1889
Gothic Revival church buildings in Iowa
Lutheran churches in Iowa
Buildings and structures in Franklin County, Iowa
National Register of Historic Places in Franklin County, Iowa
Churches on the National Register of Historic Places in Iowa
Cemeteries on the National Register of Historic Places in Iowa
Historic districts on the National Register of Historic Places in Iowa
Historic districts in Franklin County, Iowa